Grace Mead de Laguna (28 September 1878 – 17 February 1978) was an American philosopher who taught at Bryn Mawr College in Pennsylvania.

Life 
Grace Mead Andrus was born on 28 September 1878 in East Berlin, Connecticut. She was the youngest child, and only daughter, of Wallace R. Andrus and Annis Andrus (née Mead). Both parents were of Connecticut ancestry dating back to the 17th century. Her mother, Annis, had been a school teacher. Her father had served with the 17th Connecticut Volunteers during the Civil War, He would later work as a land agent for the Northern Pacific Railway whilst it was being built.  This led to the family moving, whilst Grace was young, to the (then) Washington Territory, first to Cheney, then Tacoma, where she received a pioneer upbringing.

Grace Andrus took the AB from Cornell University in 1903, where she was Phi Beta Kappa. And, upon presentation of a dissertation titled “The Mechanical Theory in Pre-Kantian Rationalism”, she received her PhD in philosophy there in 1906.

Whilst studying for the latter she met Theodore de Laguna, an instructor there, whom she married in 1905.

After holding a position at the University of Michigan from 1905, Theodore served, from 1907, as a professor of philosophy at Bryn Mawr College in Pennsylvania. Grace became an assistant professor there in 1912, an associate professor in 1916 and a full professor in 1928. She became chair of philosophy at Bryn Mawr after Theodore's death in 1930.  She would retire as Professor Emerita in 1944. She continued to write, publishing her third book in 1963.

Her daughter, born in 1906, was the anthropologist Frederica de Laguna, whom Grace would accompany on several anthropological field trips. Her son Wallace de Laguna, who was born in 1910, was a geologist who worked for the U.S. Geological Survey and later for the Oak Ridge National Laboratories in Tennessee.

Grace de Laguna died, aged 99, on 17 February 1978 in Devon, Pennsylvania.

Works
Books
 Dogmatism and Evolution: Studies in Modern Philosophy, with Theodore de Laguna (New York, 1910). [At Internet Archive]
 Speech: Its Function and Evolution (New Haven, Conn., 1927). [At Internet Archive]
 On Existence and the Human World (New Haven, Conn., 1963).

Articles/Book Chapters
The Practical Character of Reality in The Philosophical Review, vol. 18, no. 4, 1909, pp. 396–415. [Free at JSTOR]
Phenomena and Their Determination in The Philosophical Review, vol. 26, no. 6, 1917, pp. 622–633. [Free at JSTOR]
The Limits of the Physical in Philosophical Essays in Honor of James Edwin Creighton (1917) [At Internet Archive]

Free early journal works [via JSTOR] at Internet Archive

References

External links
Portraits
1906 photograph of Grace de Laguna (via Google Books).
1906 photograph of Grace de Laguna with her daughter
1920s portrait of Grace with her husband and children, 1934 photograph of Grace on one of her daughter's field trips to Alaska, here at JSTOR (free to read with registration)
1938 press clipping photo of Grace with her daughter (full article clipping) from the Seattle Post-Intelligencer
Grace de Laguna by Hilde Foss (Oil on canvas portrait, from before December 1943)

Other Resources
Grace de Laguna: A forgotten pioneer in the history of the language sciences University of Nottingham blog post by Brigitte Nerlich (30 August 2019)
Grace and Theodore de Laguna, and the Making of Willard V. O. Quine  'Digressions & Impressions' blog post by Joel Katzav (4 May 2018)
Grace de Laguna papers [Finding Aid, also here]

American philosophy academics
American philosophers
Cornell University alumni
1878 births
1978 deaths
People of the Washington Territory